Cirey is a commune in the Haute-Saône department in the region of Bourgogne-Franche-Comté in eastern France.

See also
 Bellevaux Abbey
 Communes of the Haute-Saône department

References

External links

 Official website for the town of Cirey

Communes of Haute-Saône